Jinshi is a town in Chao'an District, Chaozhou, Guangdong, China. , it has one residential community and 21 villages under its administration.

References

Township-level divisions of Guangdong
Chaozhou